Yellow light may refer to:

Light in the visible color spectrum that is yellow(575~594 nm)
A yellow traffic light (also described as an "amber light")
"Yellow Light", a song by Pharrell Williams created for the 2017 film Despicable Me 3
"Yellow Light", a song by Icelandic indie folk band Of Monsters and Men on My Head Is an Animal
Manjal Veiyil (English: Yellow Light), a 2009 Tamil language film starring Prasanna and Sandhya in the lead roles

See also
"Yellow light of death" (YLOD), an issue reported with the PlayStation 3
Light yellow, a shade of yellow
Light Yellow, an X11 color name